Ludwik Sempoliński (18 August 1899 – 17 April 1981) was a Polish film actor. He appeared in twenty films between 1935 and 1966.

Selected filmography
 Jaśnie pan szofer (1935)
 Barbara Radziwiłłówna (1936)
 Róża (1936)
 Paweł i Gaweł (1938)
 Warsaw Premiere (1951)
 Irena do domu! (1955)

References

External links

1899 births
1981 deaths
Polish male film actors
Polish male stage actors
Male actors from Warsaw
Commanders of the Order of Polonia Restituta
Polish cabaret performers
Recipients of the Order of the Banner of Work
20th-century Polish male actors
20th-century comedians